The Australasian Performing Right Association Awards of 1998 (generally known as APRA Awards) are a series of awards held in May 1998. The APRA Music Awards were presented by Australasian Performing Right Association (APRA) and the Australasian Mechanical Copyright Owners Society (AMCOS). The awards resumed in 1998 after a hiatus in 1997.

Only one classical music award was available in 1998: Most Performed Contemporary Classical Composition. APRA provided awards for "Best Television Theme", and "Best Film Score" in 1998. APRA and AMCOS also sponsored the Australian Guild of Screen Composers (AGSC), which provided their own awards ceremony, from 1996 to 2000, with categories for film and TV composers.

Awards 

Nominees and winners with results indicated on the right.

See also 

 Music of Australia

References

External links 

 APRA official website
 APRA Awards - History

1998 in Australian music
1998 music awards
APRA Awards